A Steinmetz curve is the curve of intersection of two right circular cylinders of radii  and  whose axes intersect perpendicularly. In case of  the Steimetz curves are the edges of a Steinmetz solid.

 

It is named after mathematician Charles Proteus Steinmetz, along with Steinmetz's equation, Steinmetz solids, and Steinmetz equivalent circuit theory.

In the case when the two cylinders have equal radii the curve degenerates to two intersecting ellipses.

See also 
 Cylinder

References 

Curves
Euclidean geometry